Slovakia–United Kingdom relations are foreign relations between Slovakia and United Kingdom. The United Kingdom has an embassy in Bratislava, while Slovakia has an embassy in London.

Both countries established diplomatic relations in 1993. Both countries are full members of NATO.

Agreements
The two countries ratified an air services agreement in 2004.

Diplomacy

Republic of Slovakia
London (Embassy) 

of the United Kingdom
Bratislava (Embassy)

See also 
 Foreign relations of Slovakia
 Foreign relations of the United Kingdom
 Slovaks in the United Kingdom
 Britons in Slovakia

References

External links

 
United Kingdom
Bilateral relations of the United Kingdom